Ceará-Mirim is a city in Rio Grande do Norte, Brazil. The population is 73,886 and the area is 739.686 km2.

Etymology 
The origin of the city name is a mystery. Câmara Cascudo, one of the most important historians in Brazil, gives some alternatives from other authors, with all the alternatives leading to the Tupi language. José de Alencar suggests us that Ceará comes from the Tupi expression cê-ará, meaning "the parrot speaks" or "the parrot sings". Teodoro Sampaio gives us ceará or cemo-ará, which is "the parrot leaves" or "the parrot's departure". There are also the versions of Paulino Nogueira and João Brigido, who suggest, respectively, çoô-ará and ciri-ará, that are "truly hunting time" and "white crab".

History 
The area was inhabited by indigenous people before the arrival of the Portuguese. In the 17th century the Society of Jesus settled here. The founding of the town came in 1755.

Initially inhabited by indigenous people (Potiguars) next to the riverside of  the Ryo Seara, later, the Ceará-Mirim River. The Potiguars made their first contacts with the European world by the trade of pau-brasil wood with the French and Spanish people. Later, with the consolidation of the colony of Brazil, it was occupied by the Portuguese people.

The region of the Ryo Seara was occupied because the land was good for agriculture, and some farming and cattle raising took place. By the 18th century there were many sesmarias (special Portuguese concession of lands for agriculture and cattle development) completely dividing the region with the biggest or the smallest utility. The first mills of Ceará-Mirim emerged after 1840, but by 1858, when the transference of the headquarters occurred, there were remarkable industrial and livestock developments.

In the letters of the Ouvidor Domingos Monteiro da Rocha, in July 1757, he included the Povoação do Ceará-Mirim (Ceará-Mirim village), where he says "with many residents". The first school emerged only in 1858, installed at Bôca da Mata, Extremoz county. The first meeting of the city council occurred on 14 October 1858, in Ceará-Mirim Village.

References 

Populated coastal places in Rio Grande do Norte
Municipalities in Rio Grande do Norte